The Founder is a 2016 American biographical drama film directed by John Lee Hancock and written by Robert Siegel. Starring Michael Keaton as businessman Ray Kroc, the film depicts the story of his creation of the McDonald's fast-food restaurant chain, which eventually involved forcing out the company's original founders to take control with conniving ruthlessness. Nick Offerman and John Carroll Lynch co-star as McDonald's founders Richard and Maurice McDonald, alongside Linda Cardellini as Ray Kroc's third wife Joan Smith, and B. J. Novak as McDonald's president and chief executive Harry J. Sonneborn.

The film premiered at Arclight Hollywood on December 7, 2016, and was released theatrically in the United States on January 20, 2017, by the Weinstein Company. It grossed $24 million worldwide and received generally positive reviews from critics, who praised Keaton's performance.

Plot
In 1954, traveling milkshake machine salesman Ray Kroc observes that many of the drive-in restaurants that he tries to sell to are run inefficiently. After learning that a drive-in in San Bernardino, California is ordering an unusually large number of milkshake mixers, Kroc drives to see it. What he finds is McDonald's—a popular walk-up restaurant with fast service, high-quality food, disposable packaging and a family-friendly atmosphere.

Kroc meets with Maurice "Mac" and Richard "Dick" McDonald, who give him a tour of the restaurant. The next day, Kroc suggests that the brothers franchise the restaurant, but they hesitate, pointing out that they already tried, only to fail. Kroc persists and eventually convinces the brothers to allow him to lead their franchising efforts on the condition that he agrees to a strict contract, which requires all changes to be subject to the McDonald brothers' approval.

Kroc begins building a McDonald's restaurant in Des Plaines, Illinois, while attempting to entice wealthy investors to open franchises, but encounters the same poor management ethic which doomed the original franchise efforts. After encountering a Jewish Bible salesman, Kroc hits on the idea of franchising to middle-class investors. It proves successful and new franchises begin opening across the Midwest, with Kroc representing himself as the creator of McDonald's and Fred Turner, a burger cook at the Des Plaines restaurant, as his associate. During that time, Kroc meets Rollie Smith, an upscale restaurant owner in Minnesota who wishes to invest, and Rollie's wife, Joan, to whom Kroc is immediately attracted.

Despite his success Ray Kroc expands rapidly, but his share of franchise profits are limited due to his contract, which the McDonald brothers decline to renegotiate. Joan Smith suggests saving money by introducing a powdered milkshake, but the brothers consider it to be degrading to their food quality standards. Kroc's wife Ethel is upset by a visit from the bank; his mortgage is three months' late and she did not know Kroc had mortgaged their house. Harry Sonneborn, a financial consultant, tells Kroc that the real profit opportunity is in providing real estate to the franchisees, which will not only provide a revenue stream, but give Kroc leverage over his franchisees and the brothers. Kroc incorporates a new company, Franchise Realty Corporation, and attracts new investors, while opening new restaurants without the brothers' approval. This upsets the brothers and emboldens Kroc; he increasingly defies them by circumventing their authority and providing powdered milkshakes to all franchisees, but not their restaurant. Kroc also divorces Ethel who gets all his assets except any shares in his business.

Ray Kroc renames the company the McDonald's Corporation and demands to be released from his contract; he plans to buy the McDonald brothers out, the news of which sends Mac into diabetic shock. Kroc visits him in the hospital and offers a blank check to settle their business. The brothers agree to a $2.7 million lump sum payment (equivalent to $26 million in 2020), ownership of their original restaurant in San Bernardino, and a 1% annual royalty, but when the time comes to finalize the agreement, Kroc refuses to include the royalty in the settlement and instead offers it as a handshake deal. Afterwards Dick McDonald confronts Kroc and asks why he had to take over their business, when he could have easily stolen their idea and recreated it. Kroc says that the true value of McDonald's is the name itself, which expresses the attributes of Americana.

The McDonald brothers are forced to take their own name off the original restaurant and Kroc opens a new McDonald's franchise directly across the street. Kroc marries Joan Smith who has left Rollie Smith. In 1970, Kroc prepares a speech for California Governor Ronald Reagan —plagiarized heavily from a motivational speech he heard earlier in the film—crediting himself for his success, which he claims he achieved not through talent or education, but through persistence.

An epilogue reveals that the McDonald brothers were never paid royalties, which would have eventually been about $100 million a year. It says every day McDonald's feeds approximately 1% of the world's population.

Cast
 Michael Keaton as Ray Kroc
 Nick Offerman as Richard "Dick" McDonald
 John Carroll Lynch as Maurice "Mac" McDonald
 Linda Cardellini as Joan Smith
 B. J. Novak as Harry J. Sonneborn
 Laura Dern as Ethel Kroc
 Justin Randell Brooke as Fred Turner
 Kate Kneeland as June Martino
 Patrick Wilson as Rollie Smith
 Griff Furst as Jim Zien
 Wilbur Fitzgerald as Jerry Cullen
 Afemo Omilami as Mr. Merriman

Production
The screenplay for The Founder was written by Robert Siegel, based on Ray Kroc's autobiography and an unauthorized biography. According to early reports, the film was to be developed in the same vein as There Will Be Blood and The Social Network. According to Deadline Hollywood, it was ranked the 13th-best unproduced script of 2014. In December 2014, John Lee Hancock was signed to direct the film.

Casting
In February 2015, Michael Keaton was signed to the role of Ray Kroc. Laura Dern joined the film on May 11, 2015 to play Kroc's wife Ethel Fleming, whom Kroc divorced in 1961. The next day, it was announced that Nick Offerman joined the film, set to play Richard "Dick" McDonald. On May 28, 2015, it was announced that B. J. Novak joined the film as Kroc's financial consultant, Harry J. Sonneborn. On June 9, 2015, it was reported that Linda Cardellini had joined the film, and on June 26, 2015, it was announced that John Carroll Lynch and Patrick Wilson had also been cast.

Filming
Principal photography for the film began in Newnan, Georgia on June 1, 2015. Production designer Michael Corenblith had previously worked on films including Apollo 13, Saving Mr. Banks and The Blind Side in which attention to historic detail was important. Corenblith worked from archival photos, training films, materials provided by the McDonald family, blueprints obtained from eBay, and research at the oldest McDonald's restaurant in Downey, California. The McDonald brothers' original octagonal San Bernardino restaurant was built in Newnan in the parking lot of the Coweta County administration building.

After a month of searching for a suitable location, an old-style McDonald's building set with the "golden arches" was constructed in a church parking lot in seven working days in Douglasville, Georgia. The set included a working kitchen with period-accurate kitchen equipment that was brought up to current code. Rearrangement of exterior features such as parking lot striping allowed that set to serve as each franchise location portrayed in the film. Both interior and exterior portions of the restaurant were modular, allowing countertops or entire wall-sized glass panes to be removed to make room for cameras and other equipment.
 Douglasville, Georgia site of McDonald's building set: 

The J. Mack Robinson College of Business Administration Building in downtown Atlanta, which houses a Bank of America branch, served as the Illinois First Federal Savings & Loan Association building. Some interior sets were built on soundstages at EUE Screen Gems Studios in Atlanta. Atlanta's East Lake Golf Club served as Rolling Green Country Club in the film.

Release
On March 2, 2015, The Weinstein Company paid $7 million for the film's distribution rights. On March 26, 2015, the studio set the film for a November 25, 2016 release date. In March 2016, the film was moved up to August 5, 2016. On July 13, 2016, the film's release date was delayed until a limited December 16, 2016 date, followed by a wide release on January 20, 2017. The film eventually opened in the United States at Arclight Hollywood on December 7, 2016, in order to qualify for the 2017 Oscars.

In February 2017 FilmNation Entertainment, one of the film's production companies, sued The Weinstein Company for $15 million. The Weinstein Company released Gold on January 27, 2017, a week after The Founder, which FilmNation claimed was a breach of contract, saying the two companies had an agreement that no Weinstein Company film would be released within a week before or after The Founder.

Reception

Box office
The Founder grossed $12.8 million in the United-States and Canada and $11.3 million in others territories, for a worldwide total of $24.1 million.

In North America, the film was expected to gross $3 million from 1,115 theaters in its opening weekend. It ended up earning $3.8 million, finishing 9th at the box office. In its second week the film made $2.6 million, a drop of 23.4%.

Critical response
On review aggregator Rotten Tomatoes, the film has an approval rating of 81% based on 243 reviews, with a weighted average of 6.90/10. The website's critical consensus reads, "The Founder puts Michael Keaton's magnetic performance at the center of a smart, satisfying biopic that traces the rise of one of America's most influential businessmen – and the birth of one of its most far-reaching industries." On Metacritic, the film holds a weighted average score 66 out of 100, based on 47 critics, indicating "generally favorable reviews". Audiences polled by CinemaScore gave the film an average grade of "B+" on an A+ to F scale.

Rolling Stones Peter Travers gave the film three out of four stars, stating director Hancock and screenwriter Siegel did "strive hard—and mostly succeed—at keeping Hollywood sentiment out of the storytelling.... Set more than a half century ago, The Founder proves to be a movie for a divisive here and now. Step right up. You might just learn something." RogerEbert.com's Matt Zoller Seitz gave the film three out of four stars saying that despite the film over-relying on exposition and failing to skillfully incorporate Ray Kroc's personal life into the narrative, "I'd be lying if I said I hadn't thought about The Founder constantly since seeing it... It's an ad that becomes a warning before circling around and becoming another, darker kind of advertisement, and one of the most intriguing and surprising things about The Founder is that, in the end, it seems vaguely ashamed of itself for letting this happen".

Accolades

References

External links
 
 
 
 
 Official screenplay

2010s biographical drama films
2010s business films
2016 drama films
2016 films
American biographical drama films
American business films
American historical films
Biographical films about businesspeople
Drama films based on actual events
FilmNation Entertainment films
Films about food and drink
Films about McDonald's
Films directed by John Lee Hancock
Films scored by Carter Burwell
Films set in 1954
Films set in 1970
Films set in California
Films set in Illinois
Films set in Minnesota
Films set in Missouri
Films set in restaurants
Films set in the 1950s
Films set in the 1960s
Films shot in Atlanta
Films shot in Georgia (U.S. state)
The Weinstein Company films
2010s English-language films
2010s American films